Business of Punishment is the fourth full-length album by industrial/hip hop artists Consolidated, released in 1994. It was their only record to be released by London Records. The album peaked at #28 on the CMJ Radio Top 150 and #53 on the UK Albums Chart.

The cover is by Barbara Kruger.

Track listing
 "Cutting"  – 5:09
 "Business of Punishment"  – 5:50
 "Born of a Woman"  – 4:01
 "Das Habe Ich Nicht Gewusst"  – 5:20
 "No Answer for a Dancer"  – 4:44
 "Meat, Meat, Meat & Meat"  – 0:50
 "Dog & Pony Show"  – 3:42
 "Today Is My Birthday"  – 6:23
 "Butyric Acid"  – 3:53
 "Woman Shoots John"  – 4:35
 "Consolidated Buries the Mammoth"  – 5:47
 "Worthy Victim"  – 5:19
 "Recuperation"  – 2:24
 "Empowerless"  – 7:35
 "Emancipate Yourself"  – 4:52

References

1994 albums
Consolidated (band) albums